St. Mary's Basilica is a Catholic Church in Invercargill, New Zealand. It was designed by the celebrated New Zealand architect, Francis Petre and was opened in 1905. The Basilica, named such because of its style of architecture, it rises 37M above the ground and is one of the most prominent landmarks in Invercargill, it was once described as the "Prettiest church in Australasia". is located near St Josephs School, the Otepuni Gardens and Te Tomairangi Marae. The building is listed as a Category I Historic Place.

References

Heritage New Zealand Category 1 historic places in Southland, New Zealand
Buildings and structures in Invercargill
20th-century Roman Catholic church buildings in New Zealand
Roman Catholic churches completed in 1905
Francis Petre church buildings
Church buildings with domes
Basilica churches in New Zealand
Tourist attractions in Southland, New Zealand
Listed churches in New Zealand
1910s architecture in New Zealand
1905 establishments in New Zealand